The Tassajara Zen Mountain Center is the oldest Japanese Buddhist Sōtō Zen monastery in the United States. It is on the border of the Ventana Wilderness and within the Los Padres National Forest, southeast of Carmel-by-the-Sea, California. During the winter months the Center can be inaccessible due to snow and rain. Practitioners live and study on site. From Memorial Day to Labor Day, the Center is open to day and overnight guests. The natural hot springs have been developed into Japanese-style baths. A steam bath is built over a hot spring in Tassajara Creek. The Center is the first Zen monastery established outside Asia.

History

The name is a corruption of Tasajera, a Spanish-American word derived from an indigenous Esselen word, which means ‘place where meat is hung to dry.’"

The 126-acre mountain property surrounding the Tassajara Hot Springs was purchased by the San Francisco Zen Center in 1967 for the below-market price of $300,000  from Robert and Anna Beck. They improved the property and renamed it The Tassajara Zen Mountain Center, or Zenshinji (Zen Mind Temple), during Shunryu Suzuki's tenure as its first abbot. When it was purchased in 1967, it was the first Zen monastery outside Asia.

Tassajara's remote location in the Coastal Range means it is often threatened by wildfires. In 2008 the Basin Complex Fire reached the monastery; some monks stayed and successfully protected it from the fire, after which the San Francisco Zen Center organized a trained group of firefighters to defend its three monasteries, known as "fire monks" after a book about the 2008 events. An external sprinkler system was also installed on buildings, called "dharma rain". The Tassajara Center was threatened by the 2016 Soberanes Fire; it escaped damage but was closed to guests for the remainder of the year. In June 2021, the Willow Fire threatened the monastery.

Calendars and schedules

Practice periods
A practice period (ango  in Japanese) denotes a period of intensive monastic practice.  During the fall (September–December) and spring (January–April) practice periods, Tassajara is closed to the public.  The rigorous schedule is a defining feature.  Activity revolves around zazen (meditation), study, and work.

Guest season

After the practice periods, Tassajara is open to the public from mid-April through early September. For students, this period also allows them to earn credits toward the fall and spring practice periods.  The guest season, with less rigorous daily schedules, is a cornerstone of Tassajara's economic well-being.

The guest program includes a major kitchen operation. Tassajara is renowned for its vegetarian cuisine. Tassajara personnel also founded the Tassajara Bakery in Ashbury Heights and Greens Restaurant at Fort Mason in the Marina District in San Francisco.  Edward Espe Brown's Tassajara Bread Book, published by Shambhala Publications in 1970 and revised in 1986 and 1995, is often credited as a major catalyst for the popularity of artisanal baking in the United States, while his Tassajara Recipe Book is the best known of several books of general vegetarian cuisine produced by authors connected with the Center.

Gallery

See also
 American Zen Teachers Association
 Soto Zen Buddhist Association
 Retreat (spiritual)
 Timeline of Zen Buddhism in the United States
 Glossary of Japanese Buddhism

References

External links

 Official Tassajara Zen Mountain Center website
 Archive.org: Interview with Bob Beck
 Tassajara page on cuke.com – extensive

Buddhist temples in California
Buddhist monasteries in the United States
San Francisco Zen Center
Soto temples
Religious buildings and structures in Monterey County, California
Buddhism in California
Buddhist organizations based in the United States
Spiritual retreats
Tourist attractions in Monterey County, California
Zen centers in California
Hot springs of California
1967 establishments in California